Jacob Cornelius (born October 2, 1984) is an American rower. He competed in the Men's eight event at the 2012 Summer Olympics.  He also rowed in the 2007 University Boat Race.

References

External links
 

1984 births
Living people
American male rowers
Olympic rowers of the United States
Rowers at the 2012 Summer Olympics
People from Magnolia, Arkansas
Sportspeople from Arkansas
Cambridge University Boat Club rowers
Alumni of Emmanuel College, Cambridge
Stanford University alumni